The K.L.E Society's KLE College of Engineering and Technology (KLECET)  is an engineering college in Chikodi, Belgaum, India. Established in 2008, it is one of the institutes under the banner of Karnatak Lingayat Education Society(KLE). KLECET is approved by the AICTE and recognized by University Grant Commission of India. KLECET is affiliated to Visvesvaraya Technological University, Belgaum for its BE course and certified with ISO 9001 : 2001 as of December 2016.
The institute has eight academic departments.

Department of Civil Engineering 
Head Of Department - Prof. Amar Chougale

The department offers undergraduate course with an intake of 60.
 Course offered: Bachelor of Engineering.

Infrastructure / Facilities:

Various labs:
 Basic Material Testing Lab
 Surveying
 Applied Engineering Geology Lab
 Hydraulics & Hydraulics Machinery Lab
 CAD Lab
 Geotechnical Engineering Lab
 Concrete & Highway Lab
 Environmental Engineering

Department of Computer Science and Engineering 
Head Of Department - Satish S. Bhojannawar

The department offers undergraduate course with an intake of 120.
 Course offered: Bachelor of Engineering.

Infrastructure / Facilities:

Various labs:
 Computer Centre
 Software Prog. Lab-I and II
 Network Prog. Lab
 Hardware Lab
 Browsing Center

Department of Electronics and Communication Engineering 

Head Of Department - Prof.Jayashri Rudagi

The department offers undergraduate course with an intake of 120 students
 Course offered: Bachelor of Engineering

The department has students association [ECSA].

Infrastructure / Facilities:

Various labs:
 Analog Electronics Lab
 Logic Design Lab
 Micro-Controller Lab
 HDL Lab
 Analog Communication Lab
 Advanced Communication Lab
 Digital Signal Processing Lab
 Advanced Microprocessor Lab
 Power Electronics Lab
 Very large Scale Integration Lab

Department of Mechanical Engineering 

Head Of Department - Dr. Veerbadra Budyal

The department offers undergraduate course with an intake of 120 students.

 Courses offered: Bachelor of Engineering

Infrastructure / Facilities:

Various labs:
 Basic Workshop Lab
 Machines Shop Lab
 Computer Aided Machine Drawing Lab
 Mechanical Measurements Lab
 Material Testing Lab
 Heat Transfer Lab
 Energy Conversion Lab
 Fluid Mechanics & Machines Lab
 Heat & Mass Transfer Lab
 Design Lab
 Computer Aided Analysis Lab

Basic Science departments

Department of Physics 
Head Of Department - Dr.Rizwana Begum

Department of Chemistry 
Head Of Department - Dr. Rudragouda K. Patil

The department of Chemistry is recognized as a Research Center under VTU, Belgaum in the academic year 2013–14.

Department of Mathematics 
Head Of Department - Sachin M. Mekkalike

Department of Humanities 
Department of Humanities handles English, Constitution of India & Professional Ethics and CIV (Environmental Studies).

Student amenities

Hostel
The institute offers in-campus hostel facility for boys with 100 rooms with capacity of 250 plus students. And separate hostel facility for girls.
Each hostel has gym and indoor games facilities for Carom, Chess, Table-Tennis and Badminton.

Sports & Gymkhana
KLECET has facilities for sports and gymnasium for both Girls and Boys Students for Out-door games like - 
Running Track, Cricket, Football, Basket Ball, Through Ball, Long jump, High jump, Valley Ball, Double Bar, kho-kho and kabaddi.

Women Cell
The Women's Cell of K.L.E. College of Engineering and Technology, Chikodi was established in 2010, in accordance with the Supreme Court ruling of 1997 on the issue of sexual harassment in the workplace.

Library
The institute has library with more than 20,000 volumes. In addition to this every department has separate library. A Digital library contains accommodating more than 350 students is being established & will be made available to the students from the academic year 2014–15. The library is also a member of DELNET.

Transport

Placement Cell
Students have been placed in TESCO HSC, Ness Technologies, Mindtree, Global Edge Software, Syntel Inc, Sankalp Semiconductors (P) Ltd, Infosys, Wipro, TCS, Sobha Developers, KarMic, Cognizant, Accord Software & Systems, Antrorse Techno Soft (P) Ltd., Integra Micro Systems, Xurmo Technologies, Huawei Technologies; Persistent Systems (P) Ltd, Alpha 9 Marine, Robosoft Technologies, Shriram Group, Mphasis, NTT Data;ICICI, Prosoft e-Solutions; Quadra Minds Tech, NIIT Youva Jyoti, Laqsh, iGate Global, Robert Bosch, TKM Softech (P) Ltd, Thomson Reauters, Quest Global, K. B. Foundation (P) Ltd - Bangalore;
Ablaze Info Solutions - Delhi NCR; Lynado Technologies - Gurgaon; Oracle India, Accenture, Volkswagen, BEL, Spanktronics, Vasundhara Automations, Reliance Telecom, Unisys Global, Amphenol, SLN Technologies, Digidon India, Alliance Tech, Micro Technologies, DB Com Systems, HCL Technologies, PESIT, HP; HIT, OnMobile, Promantia Global, Pepsico India, Infolife Technologies, Aditya Birla, Flipkart.com; KLE CET - Chikodi.

External links

References 

Affiliates of Visvesvaraya Technological University
Educational institutions established in 2008
2008 establishments in Karnataka
Engineering colleges in Belgaum